The eight season of the One Piece anime series contains The "Water Seven" Chapter. Its episodes are directed by Kōnosuke Uda and Munehisa Sakai and produced by Toei Animation. The episodes are based on Eiichirō Oda's One Piece manga series, and adapt the 34th through 39th volumes of its source material over thirty-five episodes. They initially ran from April 17, 2005 through April 30, 2006 on Fuji TV. Twelve DVD compilations, each containing three episodes, were released by Toei between January 10 to December 5, 2007. In October 2011, Funimation announced they had acquired this season, along with the entirety of the previous season for release as part of their own US "Season Four".  The press release stated that the episodes would be featured in 16:9 widescreen.  The press release also mentioned that the episodes would be released in "HD" hinting at a possible Blu-ray release, but made no direct mention of the high definition disc format.

The season centers around the intrigue of Water Seven as Nico Robin leaves the crew to seemingly join up with Cipher Pol No. 9, a hidden organization under the world government as the Straw Hat Pirates are accused of an attempted assassination on Iceberg, the leader of Water Seven and the Galley-La Company. Meanwhile, most of their money is stolen from Usopp by Franky's henchmen before they could use it for repairs. Later, after finding out the Going Merry was unrepairable, Usopp leaves when Luffy reluctantly admits that the ship is done for.

The season uses five pieces of theme music: one opening theme and four ending themes. In English speaking territories, "Mirai Koukai" was replaced with "Eternal Pose" due to music licensing issues.


Episode list

Home releases

Japanese

English
In North America, this season was recategorized as part of "Season Four" for its DVD release by Funimation Entertainment. The Australian Season Four sets were renamed Collection 18 through 21.

Notes

References

2005 Japanese television seasons
2006 Japanese television seasons
One Piece seasons
One Piece episodes